Hakea obtusa is a shrub in the family  Proteaceae  and is endemic to an area along the south coast in the Goldfields-Esperance  regions of Western Australia. It has white and pink fragrant flowers in autumn and spring.

Description
It blooms profusely from May to September and produces sweetly scented white and pink flowers with long creamy white styles which appear at the nodes on bare wood. The fruit are rough ovoid ending in a short sharp beak.

Taxonomy and naming
The species was first formally described by Carl Meisner in 1856.  Named from the Latin obtusus - blunt, referring to the shape of the leaf.

Distribution and habitat
Hakea obtusa is confined to Ravensthorpe and the Fitzgerald River National Park. Grows in shrubland and low woodland on loamy-clay, gravel and ironstone. A frost tolerant species that requires good drainage and a sunny aspect.

Conservation status
Hakea obtusa is classified "not threatened" by the Western Australian Government.

References

obtusa
Eudicots of Western Australia
Plants described in 1856